Tortrimosaica is a genus of moths belonging to the family Tortricidae. It contains only one species, Tortrimosaica polypodivora, which is found in Brazil.

The larvae are gall inducers on the stems of Microgramma squamulosa.

References

External links
tortricidae.com

Hilarographini
Monotypic moth genera
Tortricidae genera